Haida may refer to:

Places
 Haida, an old name for Nový Bor 
 Haida Gwaii, meaning "Islands of the People", formerly called the Queen Charlotte Islands
 Haida Islands, a different archipelago near Bella Bella, British Columbia

Ships
 , a 1909-built steamship that served in the US Navy as  USS Quincy (AK-10)
 , United States Coast Guard cutter in commission from 1921 to 1947
 , Canadian Tribal-class destroyer that served from 1943 to 1963

People with the surname
 Mahjoub Haïda (born 1970), Moroccan middle-distance runner
 Moses Haida, German mathematician
 Samuel Haida (1626–1685), Bohemian Kabbalist
 , Japanese composer and musician

Fictional characters
 Haida, a character in Aggressive Retsuko

Haida culture
 Haida people, an indigenous ethnic group of North America (Canada)
Council of the Haida Nation, their collective government body
Haida language, their language 
Haida argillite carvings, an art form that is a Haida specialty
Haida manga, a hybrid art form combining traditional Haida art and Japanese manga

Other uses
 Hai-Da, abbreviation for Hainan University, from the Mandarin Chinese Hainan Daxue

See also

 Hada (disambiguation)
 Hadda (disambiguation)
 

Language and nationality disambiguation pages
Japanese-language surnames